Sergio Moreno may refer to:
 Sergi Moreno (born 1987), Andorran footballer
 Sergio Moreno (footballer, born 1992), Panamanian footballer
 Sergio Moreno (footballer, born 1999), Spanish footballer
 Sergio Moreno (weightlifter) (born 1950), Nicaraguan Olympic weightlifter